"Kill Me Now" is the third episode of the first season of the American comedy-drama series Gilmore Girls. It originally aired on the WB in the United States on October 19, 2000. The episode was written Joanne Waters and directed by Adam Nimoy.

Synopsis
When Rory announces that she has to pick a team sport to play at Chilton, Emily insists that Richard take Rory to the club and teach her golf. Although Rory tees off to a rocky start, she soon gets into the swing of things and has a great time walking and talking with Richard. Richard is impressed by Rory's taste in books, as are his friends at the club. Meanwhile, Lorelai feels jealous of Rory's growing relationship with her grandparents, culminating in an explosive argument between mother and daughter.

Cast
 Scott Patterson as Luke Danes
 Melissa McCarthy as Sookie St. James
 Yanic Truesdale as Michel Gerard
 Lauren Graham as Lorelai Gilmore
 Alexis Bledel as Rory Gilmore
 Kelly Bishop as Emily Gilmore
 Edward Herrmann as Richard Gilmore

Recurring Roles

 Ted Rooney as Morey Dell
 Alex Borstein as Drella
 Sally Struthers as Babette Dell
 Liz Torres as Miss Patty
 Jackson Douglas as Jackson Melville

Music
 "La Casa" by  / Mauricio Venegas 
 "Teach Me Tonight" by Sammy Cahn & Gene de Paul
 "Here They Go" by Sam Phillips
 "Man! I Feel Like A Woman!" by Shania Twain
 "A Kiss to Build a Dream On" by Louis Armstrong
 "We Are Family" by Sister Sledge

Reception
While rewatching the series, David Sims of The A.V. Club wrote: "In these very early episodes, Lorelai and Rory’s relationship has a volatility that doesn’t really stick around." He explained that the fight between Lorelai and Rory over something minor was "a little forced and on the nose." "The show is still finding its voice, and its tone feels a touch off at times, although it’s also establishing so much of what we know and love about the Stars Hollow universe. [...] Lorelai’s stuff [at the Inn] is pleasant, but a bit of a snooze. Rory’s plot is more intriguing."

References

External links
 

Gilmore Girls episodes
2000 American television episodes